Siccia conformis is a moth in the family Erebidae. It was described by George Hampson in 1914. It is found in Kenya, Niger and Nigeria.

References

Moths described in 1914
Nudariina